Blair Joseph Herter (born June 23, 1980) is an American television personality, known for his appearances on TV series such as Road Rules: The Quest, Real World/Road Rules Challenge, Attack of the Show!, X-Play and American Ninja Warrior.

Early life
Herter was born in Scott, Louisiana.

Career
Herter worked for MTV, appearing on seasons of Road Rules and Real World/Road Rules Challenge series, as well as G-Hole.  In 2007 he joined the G4 Network as a producer and recurring substitute host for Attack of the Show! (and its "The Feed" segment) and X-Play. He was the co-host of season 1 of American Ninja Warrior with Alison Haislip.  During the 2013 Electronic Entertainment Expo, Blair co-anchored Microsoft's nightly Xbox @ E3 Live streaming event coverage on Xbox Live with former G4 personalities Morgan Webb and Kevin Pereira. Herter joined Midnight Oil Agency as an executive director for business development and in 2019 joined the marketing group Advncr as chief brand officer and senior vice president of partnerships.

In 2020, he returned to G4 as vice president of content partnerships and brand development for Comcast Spectacor, the division overseeing the relaunch.

In 2022, Herter left G4 and moved to the Netherlands to take an executive position with Team Liquid.

Personal life
In 2012, Herter married fellow G4 personality Jessica Chobot. They have a son, Emerson Roland Herter.

References

External links

1980 births
Living people
People from Scott, Louisiana
Road Rules cast members
X-Play
The Challenge (TV series) contestants
American expatriates in the Netherlands